Benbow is a surname. Notable people with the surname include:

Amos E. Benbow (1850–1922), American politician
Camilla Benbow, educational psychologist
Edwin Benbow (1895–1918), Royal Flying Corps ace
John Benbow (1653–1702), Royal Navy admiral
Katie Benbow, singer
Len Benbow (1876–1946), English footballer with Nottingham Forest and Stoke
Leon Benbow (born 1950), American retired basketball player
Steve Benbow (1931–2006), British folk guitarist, singer and music director
William Benbow (1784 – c. 1841), English nonconformist preacher, pamphleteer, pornographer, publisher and reformer

Surnames of British Isles origin